was a Japanese botanist and physician. 

Iinuma studied botany under Ono Ranzan. He spoke Dutch and was a practitioner of Western medicine. In 1856 he published the Somoku-zusetsu, the first botanical encyclopedia in Japan to use Linnaean taxonomy. The strawberry species Fragaria iinumae is named after him.

References

19th-century Japanese botanists
19th-century Japanese physicians
1782 births
1865 deaths